Covansys Corporation was a global consulting and technology services company, specializing in outsourcing of personnel and services, headquartered in Farmington Hills, Michigan. The company specialized in industry-specific solutions, strategic outsourcing and integration services. Raj Vattikuti founded Covansys in 1985, originally named Complete Business Solutions, Inc., with five employees.

In 2007, Computer Sciences Corporation (now DXC Technology) acquired Covansys for $34.00 per share in cash, or approximately $1.3 billion.

See also
 Computer Sciences Corporation
 Software industry in Telangana

References

Defunct technology companies of the United States
International information technology consulting firms
Companies established in 1985
Companies based in Oakland County, Michigan
1985 establishments in Michigan